The Adventures of Ellery Queen is the title of a radio series and two separate television series made in the 1950s. They were based on the fictional detective and pseudonymous writer Ellery Queen and the cases he solved with his father, Inspector Richard Queen.

Radio

With Hugh Marlowe in the title role, Ellery Queen was introduced in The Adventures of Ellery Queen on CBS Radio on June 18, 1939, running until September 22, 1940. In 1942, the series moved to NBC radio, airing until 1944. From 1945 to 1947, it was heard once again on CBS, returning to NBC in 1947 and then moved to ABC radio (1947–1948). The premise was that a mystery would be dramatized, but then interrupted when a panel of celebrities would attempt to solve it.

Television
The Adventures of Ellery Queen, was produced by the DuMont Television Network. It ran on DuMont from October 14, 1950, to December 6, 1951 (50 episodes), then moved to ABC from December 16, 1951, to November 26, 1952 (43 episodes).
The Further Adventures of Ellery Queen, ran for 33 episodes from 1958 to 1959 on NBC.

The Adventures of Ellery Queen (DuMont and ABC)
The first series was telecast on the DuMont Television Network from October 19, 1950, to December 6, 1951, and then on ABC from December 16, 1951, to November 26, 1952. This series starred Richard Hart as Ellery Queen in the first season and Lee Bowman in the role in later seasons. (Hart died suddenly of a heart attack in January 1951.) Florenz Ames played Inspector Richard Queen. Irving Pincus did his first work as a producer in two segments of this version of Ellery Queen. Guest stars included Anne Bancroft, John Carradine, and Eva Gabor. The series, produced by Irving and Norman Pincus and directed by Donald Richardson, featured writing by Helene Hanff, later famous as the author of 84, Charing Cross Road (Bancroft later played Hanff in the film version of 84 Charing Cross Road.)

The ABC version was sponsored by Bayuk cigars, but that sponsorship ended effective with the November 26, 1952, broadcast.

Episodes

First Season - DuMont Network

 The Bad Boy
 The Mad Tea Party
 The Invisible Lover
 The Long Count 
 The Three Lame Men
 The Human Weapon
 The Crooked Man
 The Adventure of the Blind Bullet 
 Two Pieces of Silver
 The Hanging Acrobat
 The Star of India
 The Adventures of the Survivors' Club 
 Prescription For Treason
 The House of Terror
 Murder in Hollywood
 The Adventure of the Man who Killed Cops
 The Hanging Patient
 The Adventure of the Jewel-Handled Knife
 The Case of the Falling Corpse
 The Adventure of the Strange Voyage
 The Madcap Robbery
 The Adventure of the Manhunt
 Murder at the Museum
 The Adventures of the Man who Enjoyed Death
 The Case of the Frightened Lady
 The Baseball Murder Case
 Murder for Twelve Cents
 The Key to Murder
 Death Spins a Wheel
 Dissolve to Death
 The Frame-Up
 The Happiness Club
 The Chinese Mummer Mystery
 Murder in the Zoo
 Death in a Capsule
 The Case of the Upright Man
 The Adventure of the Frightened Child
 The Adventure of the Ballet Murder

Second Season - DuMont Network

 The Adventure of the Twilight Zone
 The Dead Man who Walked
 Murder in the Death House
 The Garden of Death
 The Gridiron Murder
 The Coffee House Murder
 Death in a Ghost Town
 Murder to Music
 The Inside Man
 Pavanne for a Dead Princess
 The Adventure of the Shape-Up
 Death at the Opera

Second Season - ABC Network

 Ticket to Nowhere
 A Christmas Story
 The Long Shot
 The Unhung Jury
 Death In the Sorority House
 The Feminine Touch
 Dance of Death
 One Week to Live
 Mr. Big
 Left-Cross
 The Red Hook Murder
 King Size Death
 The File of Death
 The Bar Peaceful Murder
 Doodle of Death
 The Men Without Faces
 Death of a Wax Doll
 Cat and Mouse
 Coroner's Inquest
 The Not So Private Eye
 Rehearsal for Murder
 Prize Catch
 The Case of the Heartbroken Men
 The Third Room
 The Pool of Death
 Dead Secret
 Case of the Canvas Shroud
 A Frame for a Chair
 The Winner was Death
 Confidential Agent

Third Season - ABC Network

 The Ten Dollar Bill
 The Case of the Wise Man
 Ready For Hanging
 Legacy of Death
 Buck Fever
 Custom Made
 The Case of the Two-Faced Man
 A Touch of Death
 A Close-Up of Murder
 The Destructive Angel
 The High Executioner
 Companion to a Killer
 Double Exposure

The Further Adventures of Ellery Queen

This version featured George Nader as Ellery Queen in twenty episodes, then Lee Philips for the remainder of the season. Les Tremayne took the role of Richard Queen. Guest appearances were made by, among numerous others, film star and Oscar-nominee Nancy Carroll and stage actress Marian Seldes. The series was produced by Albert McCleery.

Episodes

 The Glass Village
 The King is Dead
 Ten Days of Wonder
 The Door Between
 The 8th Mrs Bluebeard
 Cat of Many Tails
 Death Before Bedtime
 Double, Double
 So Rich, So Lovely, So Dead
 Diamond-studded Typewriter
 Four and Twenty to Live
 Paint the Town Black
 The Hollow Man
 Bury Me Deep
 The Hinnolity Story
 The Jinn City Story
 Revolution
 The Murder of Whistler's Brother
 Death likes it Hot
 Margin of Terror
 Chauffeur Disguise
 Shadow of the Past
 The Chemistry Set
 Cartel for Murder
 A Girl Named Daisy
 The Paper Tigers
 The Lecture
 Confession of Murder
 Castaway on a Nearby Island
 The Curse of Aden
 Dance into Death
 Body of the Crime
 This Murder Comes to you Live

See also
List of programs broadcast by the DuMont Television Network
List of surviving DuMont Television Network broadcasts

References

External links
 
 DuMont historical website
 
 Public-domain episodes of The Adventures of Ellery Queen radio program
 

1950 American television series debuts
1959 American television series endings
1975 American television series debuts
1976 American television series endings
American Broadcasting Company original programming
Black-and-white American television shows
DuMont Television Network original programming
NBC original programming
Television series by ITC Entertainment
Television series by Universal Television
Television series based on radio series
1950s American crime television series
Ellery Queen